Cheese made from the milk of the reindeer has been historically found in Scandinavia. Modern Finnish cheeses like leipäjuusto were also made with reindeer milk in the past.

Reindeer milk is among the richest and most nutritious of milks, at 22% butterfat and 10% protein; however a reindeer can be milked only for about 1.5 cups per day.

Historical description
Per the 1913 Pure Products:

Gallery

References

Cheeses by animal's milk
Reindeer